Fajr Rural District is in the Central District of Yazd County, Yazd province, Iran. At the National Census of 2006, its population was 12,158 in 3,256 households. There were 1,266 inhabitants in 321 households at the following census of 2011. At the most recent census of 2016, the population of the rural district was 1,401 in 437 households. The largest of its 47 villages was Shahneh, with 1,171 people.

References 

Yazd County

Rural Districts of Yazd Province

Populated places in Yazd Province

Populated places in Yazd County